Cyrus Ghani (1929 Sabzevar, Iran – 2015 New York, USA) sometimes spelled Sīrūs Ghanī, was an Iranian-born academic, lawyer, Iranian studies scholar, and film critic. Born in Sabzevar, he also lived in the United States and in London.

Ghani's published works include Iran and the West: A Critical Bibliography (1987), Iran and the Rise of Reza Shah (1998),  My Favorite Films (2004), A Man of Many Worlds: The Diaries and Memoirs of Dr. Ghasem Ghani (2006), an edited volume of the memoirs of his father, Ghasem Ghani, and Shakespeare, Persia, and the East (2008)

References

External links
Books by Cyrus Ghani

Living people
People from Sabzevar
Iranian film critics
1929 births